Yadenitsa is a tributary of Maritsa, with a length of 26 km. It has its origin near Chakaritsa, between the Rila Mountains and Rhodope Mountains,  in western Bulgaria. It enters into Maritsa near Belovo.

Rivers of Bulgaria
Landforms of Pazardzhik Province